Hockey Club Quévertois is a roller hockey team from Dinan, France, founded in 1987.

Trophies
 French Championship: (11)
 1997, 1998, 1999, 2000, 2002, 2012, 2014, 2015, 2018, 2019
 French Cup: 3
 2008, 2013, 2015

External links
Official website

Roller hockey clubs in France
Sports clubs established in 1987
1987 establishments in France